In enzymology, a D-tryptophan N-acetyltransferase is an enzyme that catalyzes the chemical reaction

acetyl-CoA + D-tryptophan  CoA + N-acetyl-D-tryptophan

Thus, the two substrates of this enzyme are acetyl-CoA and D-tryptophan, whereas its two products are CoA and N-acetyl-D-tryptophan.

This enzyme belongs to the family of transferases, specifically those acyltransferases transferring groups other than aminoacyl groups.  The systematic name of this enzyme class is acetyl-CoA:D-tryptophan N-acetyltransferase. Other names in common use include D-tryptophan acetyltransferase, and acetyl-CoA-D-tryptophan-alpha-N-acetyltransferase.

References

 

EC 2.3.1
Enzymes of unknown structure